Appen Limited (formerly known as Appen Butler Hill) is a publicly traded data company listed on the Australian Securities Exchange (ASX) under the code APX.

Appen provides or improves data used for the development of machine learning and artificial intelligence products. Data types include speech and natural language data, image and video data, text and alphanumeric data and relevance data to improve search and social media engines.

Locations 
The company's global headquarters is in Chatswood, New South Wales, 10 kilometres north of the central business district of Sydney, Australia. The United States headquarters is in Kirkland, Washington, a suburb of Seattle, and there are also US offices in San Francisco, California and Detroit, Michigan. Appen also has offices in Beijing, China; Cavite, Philippines; Exeter, England; and Tokyo, Japan.

Operations 
At the end of 2017, revenues were AUD 166.6 million and the company had more than 350 full-time employees and over 1,000,000 approved flexible workers in the Appen crowd. Tasks are performed in more than 180 languages and 130 countries.

Most of the company's revenues are earned offshore and clients include eight of the top ten largest technology companies.

Appen's customers use machine learning for a variety of use cases including automatic speech recognition (ASR), computer vision, increasing conversions in eCommerce, delivering more meaningful and personalized advertising, enhancing social media feeds or improving customer service capabilities with tools like chatbots and virtual assistants.

For machines to demonstrate artificial intelligence, they need to be programmed with human-quality training data that helps them learn. Appen uses crowdsourcing to collect and improve data and has access to a skilled crowd of over than 1 million part-time contractors who collect, annotate, evaluate, label, rate, test, translate and transcribe speech, image, text and video data to turn it into effective machine learning training data for a variety of use cases.

History 
Appen was founded in Sydney in 1996 by linguist Dr. Julie Vonwiller. She was joined by her husband Chris Vonwiller who left his job at Telstra in 2000 to join Appen full-time and is currently Non-Executive Chairman of Appen.

In 2011, Appen merged with the Butler Hill Group, which was based in Ridgefield, Connecticut and Seattle, Washington and originally founded by Lisa Braden-Harder in 1993. Lisa was a member of the pioneering team in grammar checking technology at the IBM T.J. Watson Research Center before the Butler Hill Group and stayed on as CEO until 2015. After the merger, the combined business became Appen Butler Hill and expanded its business scope to include language resources, search and text.

In 2012, Appen acquired Wikman Remer, a firm based in San Rafael, California, which developed tools and platforms for employee engagement, online moderation and curation.

Appen Butler Hill was re-branded as Appen in 2013, and it went public on the ASX on January 7, 2015, led by Lisa Braden-Harder.

In July 2015 Mark Brayan joined Appen as CEO until January 8th, 2023.  As of January 9th, 2023 Armughan Ahmad joined as CEO and President.  [28]

In October 2016 Appen acquired a UK based transcription services company called Mendip Media Group (MMG)

Appen also acquired Leapforce in November 2017 for U.S. $80M, adding additional capabilities in search relevance and growing its crowd to over 1,000,000 workers.

Appen acquired data annotation company called Leapforce in 2017. Appen acquired Figure Eight in 2019.
In 2021,Appen announced it has signed a definitive agreement to acquire Quadrant, a global leader in mobile location data, Point-of-Interest data, and corresponding compliance services.

Appen Releases State of AI Automotive Report.

External links 
 Official Website

References 

Information technology companies of Australia
Australian companies established in 1996
Australian brands
Technology companies of Australia
Technology companies established in 1996